Douglas R. Ewart (born 13 September 1946 in Kingston, Jamaica) is a Jamaican multi-instrumentalist and instrument builder. He plays sopranino and alto saxophones, clarinets, bassoon, flute, bamboo flutes (shakuhachi, ney, and panpipes), and didgeridoo; as well as Rastafarian hand drums (nyabingi, repeater, and bass).

Ewart emigrated to the United States in June 1963 (coming to Chicago) and became associated with the Association for the Advancement of Creative Musicians (AACM) in 1967, studying with Joseph Jarman and Roscoe Mitchell.  He served as that organization's president from 1979 to 1986.

He has performed or recorded with J. D. Parran, Muhal Richard Abrams, Art Ensemble of Chicago, Anthony Braxton, Alvin Curran, Anthony Davis, Robert Dick, Von Freeman, Joseph Jarman, Amina Claudine Myers, Roscoe Mitchell, James Newton, Rufus Reid, Wadada Leo Smith, Cecil Taylor, Richard Teitelbaum, Henry Threadgill, Hamid Drake, Don Byron, Malachi Favors Maghostut, and George Lewis.

In 1992, Ewart collaborated with Canadian artist Stan Douglas on the video installation Hors-champs which was featured at documenta 9 in Kassel, Germany. The installation features Ewart in an improvisation of Albert Ayler's "Spirits Rejoice" with musicians George Lewis, Kent Carter and Oliver Johnson.

He has lived in Minneapolis, Minnesota since 1990. His father, Tom, was a cricket umpire.

Discography

As leader
 Douglas R. Ewart and Inventions Clarinet Choir: Red Hills (Aarawak, 1983)
 Douglas R. Ewart and Inventions: Bamboo Forest (Aarawak, 1990)
 Douglas R. Ewart: Bamboo Meditations At Banff (Aarawak, 1994)
 Douglas R. Ewart and Inventions Clarinet Choir: Angles of Entrance (Aarawak, 1998)
 Douglas R. Ewart and Inventions Clarinet Choir: Newbeings (Aarawak, 2001)
 Douglas R. Ewart: Songs Of Sunlife - Inside The Didjeridu (Innova, 2003)
 Douglas R. Ewart and Inventions: Velvet Fire: Dedicated to Baba Fred Anderson (Aarawak, 2009)
 Nyahbingi Drum Choir: Velvet Drum Meditations (Aarawak, 2010)

As Collaborator
With Muhal Richard Abrams
 Lifea Blinec (Arista/Novus, 1978)

With Spencer Barefield and Tani Tabbal
 Beneath Detroit- The Creative Arts Collective Concerts At The Detroit Institute Of Arts 1979-1992 (Geodesic, 2010)

With Anthony Braxton
 For Trio (Arista, 1978)

With Jean-Luc Cappozzo, Joëlle Léandre, Bernard Santacruz, Michael Zerang
 Sonic Communion (The Bridge Sessions, 2015)

With Chico Freeman
 Morning Prayer (Whynot, 1976)

With Dennis González
 Namesake (Silkheart, 1987)

With Yusef Lateef, Roscoe Mitchell, Adam Rudolph
 Voice Prints (Meta Records, 2013)

With George Lewis
 Shadowgraph (Black Saint, 1978)
 Homage to Charles Parker (Black Saint, 1979)
 Jila Save! Mon. - The Imaginary Suite (Black Saint, 1979)
 Chicago Slow Dance (Lovely Music, 1981)

With Roscoe Mitchell
 L-R-G / The Maze / S II Examples (Nessa Records, 1978)
 Sketches from Bamboo (Moers Music, 1979)

With Wadada Leo Smith
 Budding of a Rose (Moers Music, 1979)

With Henry Threadgill
 X-75 Volume 1 (Arista/Novus, 1979)

References

External links
Douglas Ewart official site

1946 births
Living people
Bass clarinetists
American bassoonists
Shakuhachi players
American musical instrument makers
Musicians from Minneapolis
Didgeridoo players
Jamaican jazz musicians
Musicians from Kingston, Jamaica
Jamaican emigrants to the United States
20th-century American musicians
21st-century American musicians
21st-century clarinetists
20th-century flautists
21st-century flautists